Live from Austin is the first live recording by Ian Moore, released in 1994 (see 1994 in music).

Track listing
All songs by Ian Moore, except where noted

 "Pay No Mind" - 5:19
 "Satisfied" - 5:17
 "Deliver Me" (Ian Moore, Chris White) - 6:47
 "Blue Sky/Abraham, Martin & John" (Ian Moore/Dick Holler) - 10:08
 "Me and My Guitar" (Leon Russell, Charles Blackwell) - 7:12

Personnel
Ian Moore - guitars, vocals
Bukka Allen - piano, organ
Chris White - bass, background vocals
Michael Villegas - drums, background vocals
with:
Bradley Kopp - rhythm guitar
Kris McKay, Toni Price - backing vocals
Kathy Burdick - additional backing vocals

References

Ian Moore (musician) albums
1994 live albums
Capricorn Records live albums